The 22nd Artistic Gymnastics World Championships were held in Budapest, the capital of Hungary, in 1983.

Results

Men

Team Final

All-around

Floor Exercise

Pommel Horse

Rings

Vault

Parallel Bars

Horizontal Bar

Women

Team Final

All-around

Vault

Uneven Bars

Balance Beam

Floor Exercise

Medals

References
Gymn Forum: World Championships Results
Gymnastics 
World Championships

A
G
World Artistic Gymnastics Championships
G